Elizabeth "Libby" Copus-Brown (born 10 November 1997) is an Australian football (soccer) player, who currently plays for Lewes in the FA Women's Championship. She has previously played in the A-League Women for Newcastle Jets and for Western Sydney Wanderers.

Club career

Newcastle Jets
First played as a 16-year-old.

Western Sydney Wanderers
In November 2020, Copus-Brown joined Western Sydney Wanderers. By the time that the 2021–22 A-League Women season had started, Copus-Brown had eight seasons of professional football to her name. The amount of games per season for Copus-Brown gradually increased each season.

In April 2022, Copus-Brown joined NPL NSW side Newcastle Olympic, and 4 months later confirmed she had left Western Sydney Wanderers.

References

External links
 

Living people
Australian women's soccer players
Newcastle Jets FC (A-League Women) players
Western Sydney Wanderers FC (A-League Women) players
Women's association football midfielders
1997 births